Vilkitsky may refer to any of the following:

People
Andrey Vilkitsky (1858-1913), a Russian Arctic explorer
Boris Vilkitsky (1885-1961), a Russian Arctic explorer, son of above

Places
 The Vilkitsky Strait, a strait in the Severnaya Zemlya archipelago.
 The Vilkitsky Islands in the Nordenskiöld Archipelago in the eastern region of the Kara Sea
 The Vilkitsky Island (Kara Sea) in the southern areas of the Kara Sea
 The Vilkitsky Island (East Siberian Sea) of  the De Long Islands, in the East Siberian Sea
 The Vilkitsky island subgroup and its main island, the Vilkitsky Island, of the Komsomolskaya Pravda Islands in the Laptev Sea